The Imperial War Museum is a British national museum organisation with branches at five locations in England.

Imperial War Museum may also refer to:

Imperial War Museum Duxford, the museum's branch in Duxford, Cambridgeshire
Imperial War Museum North, the museum's branch in Trafford, Greater Manchester
Imperial War Museum tram stop, a Metrolink tram stop serving the above museum

See also
Imperial War Museum stamp collection, a stamp collection owned by the museum